Jayezan (also Romanized as Jāyezān, Jāīzān, and Jāyzān) is a city and capital of Jayezan District, in Omidiyeh County, Khuzestan Province, Iran.  At the 2006 census, its population was 1,953, in 460 families.

References

Populated places in Omidiyeh County

Cities in Khuzestan Province